Clifford Clarke Leznoff is a Canadian chemist, currently a Distinguished Research Professor at York University.

References

Year of birth missing (living people)
Living people
Academic staff of York University
Canadian chemists